During the 1939–40 season and after the outbreak of World War II which suspended the usual Scottish Football League, Hearts competed in the Emergency League Eastern Division, the Emergency Cup and the East of Scotland Shield.

Fixtures

Friendlies

Wilson Cup

East of Scotland Shield

Rosebery Charity Cup

Scottish First Division (abandoned)

Emergency Cup

Emergency League Eastern Division

See also
List of Heart of Midlothian F.C. seasons

References

External links
Official Club website
Statistical Record 39-40

Heart of Midlothian F.C. seasons
Heart of Midlothian